William Sims (1858–1936), was an admiral in the United States Navy.

William Sims may also refer to: 

William Dillwyn Sims (1825–1895), English industrialist and artist
William Edward Sims (1842–1891), American politician
William Henry Sims (1872–1955), politician in Manitoba, Canada
William H. Sims (American politician) (1837–1920), American politician in Mississippi
William Sims (engineer), pioneer of the Cornish engine
William L. Sims II (1896–1977), American businessman

See also
Willie Sims (disambiguation)
William Simms (disambiguation)